Jocelyn Delecour (born 2 January 1935) is a retired French sprinter. He competed in various sprint events at the 1956, 1960, 1964 and 1968 Olympics and won a bronze medal in 1964 in the 4×100 metre relay, together with Paul Genevay, Bernard Laidebeur and Claude Piquemal. Four years later he and Piquemal teamed up with Gérard Fenouil and Roger Bambuck to win the bronze medal once again in the same event.

At the European Championships, Delecour won a gold, a silver and a bronze medal in the 4 × 100 m (1966), 100 m (1962) and 200 m (1958) events, respectively.

References

1935 births
Living people
French male sprinters
Athletes (track and field) at the 1956 Summer Olympics
Athletes (track and field) at the 1960 Summer Olympics
Athletes (track and field) at the 1964 Summer Olympics
Athletes (track and field) at the 1968 Summer Olympics
Olympic bronze medalists for France
Olympic athletes of France
Sportspeople from Tourcoing
European Athletics Championships medalists
Medalists at the 1968 Summer Olympics
Medalists at the 1964 Summer Olympics
Olympic bronze medalists in athletics (track and field)
20th-century French people
21st-century French people